Comeblack is a compilation of songs recorded by German hard rock band Scorpions; and is intended as a comeback album, following their farewell tour. Released after the successful 2010's Sting in the Tail, half of the album features re-recorded versions of their own classic songs and the other half cover versions of 1960s and early 1970s popular rock songs. It was announced on 3 October 2011, with a planned global release date of 4 November and a US release on 24 January 2012. Comeblack was also released for streaming online by AOL Music on 23 January 2012. The album was released by Sony Music Entertainment and available in both CD and vinyl formats.

During its first week on sale in the US, Comeblack sold about 5,000 copies, debuting at number 90 on the Billboard 200 chart.

A review of Comeblack by AllMusic rated the album three out of five stars, noting that the re-recorded songs sounded "bigger than their '80s counterparts," and saying that among the covers, "Children of the Revolution" and "Tainted Love" stood out.

Track listing

Personnel
Scorpions
 Klaus Meine – lead vocals
 Rudolf Schenker – rhythm guitars, backing vocals
 Matthias Jabs – lead guitars, acoustic guitars, backing vocals 
 Paweł Mąciwoda – bass, backing vocals
 James Kottak – drums, backing vocals

Additional musicians
Amandine Bourgeois - vocals on "Je t'aime encore"
Peter Kirkman - radio voice, backing vocals
Göran Elmquist - sound designer on "The Zoo"

Production
Mikael Nord Andersson, Martin Hansen - producers, engineers, mixing, backing vocals
Ryan Smith - mastering at Sterling Sound, New York
Dirk Illing - cover artwork

Charts

References

Scorpions (band) albums
2011 albums
Sony Music albums
Covers albums